Vilmart & Cie is a Grower Champagne founded in 1890 in the Montagne de Reims region.
Its Premier cru sites are in Rilly-la-Montagne and Villers-Allerand. On 11 hectares of vineyards the house produces 8,500 cases annually. The vineyards are planted with 60% chardonnay, 36% pinot noir, and 4% pinot meunier.

See also
 List of Champagne houses
Grower Champagne
Biodynamic viticulture

References

External links

 Beyond the Bubble Machine: With small releases, single varietals, and bold expressions of terroir, the tiny growers of Champagne offer more than just big-name fizz, Lawrence Osborne, 2006/12/18

Champagne producers